"Fire and Ice" is a song by Pat Benatar, released on July 6, 1981 as the lead single off her third album, Precious Time. The track was written by Benatar, Tom Kelly, and Scott Sheets. It peaked at #17 on the U.S. Billboard Hot 100 and peaked at #2 on the U.S. Mainstream Rock chart. The song also won Benatar her second Grammy award for Best Female Rock Performance in 1982.

Record World said that "Benetar comes out rockin'" with "blistering guitars" and  "vocal rage."

Charts

References

Pat Benatar songs
Chrysalis Records singles
1981 singles
Grammy Award for Best Female Rock Vocal Performance
Songs written by Tom Kelly (musician)
1981 songs
Songs written by Pat Benatar
Song recordings produced by Keith Olsen